Vorniceni is a commune in Botoșani County, Western Moldavia, Romania. It is composed of three villages: Davidoaia, Dealu Crucii and Vorniceni.

References

Communes in Botoșani County
Localities in Western Moldavia